Only 17 may refer to:

 Meghan Trainor's 2011 independent album.
 A parody song of Nelly's "Just a Dream" made by Rucka Rucka Ali.